Riseburn was a short-lived village in County Durham, situated south of Middridge and close to Eden Pit.  It consisted of three terraces and a Primitive Methodist Chapel.

Riseburn was built in the late nineteenth century, but only survived until the 1940s.

Today, little if any trace remains of Riseburn.

References

Ghost towns in England
Villages in County Durham